Alberto Lattuada (13 November 1914 – 3 July 2005) was an Italian film director.

Career
Lattuada was born in Vaprio d'Adda, the son of composer Felice Lattuada. He was initially interested in literature, becoming, while still a student, a member of the editorial staff of the antifascist fortnightly Camminare... (1932) and part of the artists' group Corrente di Vita (1938).

Before entering the film industry, Lattuada's father made him complete his studies as an architect even though he recognized his desire to make movies. He began his film career as a screenwriter and assistant director on Mario Soldati's Piccolo mondo antico ("Old-Fashioned World", 1940). The first film he directed was Giacomo l'idealista (1943). Luci del Varietà (1950), co-directed with Federico Fellini, was the latter's first directorial endeavour. Lattuada's film La steppa (1962) was entered into the 12th Berlin International Film Festival. In 1970, he was a member of the jury at the 20th Berlin International Film Festival. New Line Cinema released his erotic film Stay As You Are theatrically in the United States in 1979.

He was married to actress Carla Del Poggio. He died at 90 years old of Alzheimer's disease. He was buried in his family's chapel in the cemetery of Morimondo.

Filmography (as director)

References

External links

1914 births
2005 deaths
People from Vaprio d'Adda
Italian film directors
Italian Roman Catholics
David di Donatello winners
David di Donatello Career Award winners
Nastro d'Argento winners
Deaths from dementia in Italy
Deaths from Alzheimer's disease